On the afternoon of 17 August 2017, 22-year-old Younes Abouyaaqoub drove a van into pedestrians on La Rambla street in Barcelona, Catalonia, Spain killing 13 people and injuring at least 130 others, one of whom died 10 days later on 27 August. Abouyaaqoub fled the attack on foot, then killed another person in order to steal the victim's car to make his escape.

Nine hours after the Barcelona attack, five men thought to be members of the same terrorist cell drove into pedestrians in nearby Cambrils, killing one woman and injuring six others. All five of those attackers were shot and killed by police.

The night before the Barcelona attack, an explosion occurred in a house in the Catalan town of Alcanar, destroying the building and killing two members of the terrorist cell, including the 40-year-old imam thought to be the mastermind. The home had more than 120 gas canisters inside which police believe the cell was attempting to make into one large bomb (or three smaller bombs to be placed in three vans that they had rented) but which they accidentally detonated.

The Prime Minister of Spain, Mariano Rajoy, called the attack in Barcelona a jihadist attack. Amaq News Agency attributed indirect responsibility for the attack to the Islamic State. The attacks were the deadliest in Spain since the March 2004 Madrid train bombings and the deadliest in Barcelona since the 1987 Hipercor bombing.

A 2022 statement by former Spanish police commissioner José Manuel Villarejo appeared to suggest in the Spanish High Court that the Spanish National Intelligence Service was aware of the attacks. Others have dismissed this statement as a conspiracy theory.

Attacks

Van attack on pedestrians in La Rambla 

Witnesses said the vehicle zigzagged at high speed down the street, ramming pedestrians and cyclists.

The numerous impacts the van had received caused the airbag to inflate and the driver protection system to automatically shut down the electrical system of the van, causing it to halt. In the confusion, Abouyaaqoub was able to get away. He fled on foot and made his way to the university district before hijacking a car and stabbing the driver to death.

The van used in the La Rambla attack was rented in the neighbouring area of Santa Perpètua de Mogoda, along with a similar van, considered to be a getaway vehicle, and found by 19:00 in Vic. Younes Abouyaaqoub's credit card was used to pay for the van rental.

In a police press conference at 19:00 local time, a spokesperson confirmed the terrorist nature of the event.

Ramming of a police barricade on Avinguda Diagonal 
About two hours after the attack on La Rambla, a white Ford Focus rammed a police barricade in Avinguda Diagonal, leaving an officer injured. The vehicle fled to a neighboring area, Sant Just Desvern, and the driver abandoned the car near the building known as Walden 7. The police found a man stabbed to death in the rear seat who, they believe, was murdered by the Ramblas driver who had escaped by hijacking the car.

Related events

Alcanar explosions

First explosion 
On August 16, the day before the Barcelona attacks, an explosion destroyed a house in Alcanar. Abdelbaki Es Satty and another man, Youssef Aallaa, died in the Alcanar explosion.

Police initially thought it was an accidental gas explosion, but hours later believed the explosion was caused by stockpiled explosives accidentally going off. A Moroccan man was injured in the explosion and taken to the hospital. The explosive TATP and 120 canisters of butane and propane were found inside the house. Catalan bomb squads carried out a controlled explosion at the property where the gas canisters were stored. There was speculation that the terrorists intended to take trucks loaded with explosives and combustible gas to attack the Sagrada Família.

Police said they were working under the hypothesis that the terrorists shot in Cambrils were connected to the Barcelona attack and Alcanar explosions. Police chief Josep Lluís Trapero believed terrorists were in the process of manipulating the gas canisters when they exploded, after which they decided to continue their plans by conducting more rudimentary vehicle ramming attacks.

Second explosion 
A second explosion occurred at the same location during excavation, possibly caused by a spark from a backhoe igniting a gas canister among the debris. At least nine people were injured, with one police officer in critical condition.

Cambrils attack 

At about 21:30 on 17 August, Houssaine Abouyaaqoub, Omar Hichamy, Mohamed Hichamy, Moussa Oukabir, and Said Aalla were seen on a security camera at a local shop purchasing four knives and one axe.

At around 1:00 AM on 18 August in Cambrils, the five men drove an Audi A3 automobile into a crowd of pedestrians before it rolled over at the intersection of Passeig Miramar, Passeig Marítim, and Rambla de Jaume I streets. The five individuals inside were wearing fake suicide vests and attacked bystanders with knives. They stabbed a 63-year-old Spanish woman to death and injured six other people in the attack, including a Cuban tourist and a police officer.

A police officer shot and killed four of the assailants, while a fifth died of his injuries hours later. Bystanders filmed one of the assailants being shot by police as he ran towards them. The men were linked to the Barcelona attack according to the police.

Subirats 
On 21 August, police shot and killed Younes Abouyaaqoub in an area of vineyards near the train tracks, thanks to the call of a neighbor of the town warning that there was a stranger in the vicinity of the town that could correspond to the terrorist from Las Ramblas.

Casualties 

Aside from eight attackers, 16 people of nine nationalities were killed: 14 who were struck by the van in La Rambla, including one who died from injuries ten days after the attack, one stabbed in Barcelona by the La Rambla attacker when the attacker stole his car, and one who was struck by the car in Cambrils. Eleven of the victims were foreign nationals, ten of them tourists. More than 130 people from over 34 nations were injured, many critically.

Suspects 
The imam Abdelbaki Es Satty died in the Alcanar gas explosion on 16 August, as did Youssef Aalla, brother of Said Aallaa. Five suspected members were shot dead by police on 18 August after the Cambrils attack: Moussa Oukabir, Omar Hychami, El Houssaine Abouyaaqoub, Said Aallaa and Mohamed Hychami. Younes Abouyaaqoub, the man believed to have been the van driver, was killed by police on 21 August. Four additional suspects were detained by police.

Younes Abouyaaqoub 
Younes Abouyaaqoub, aged 22, was born on 1 January 1995 in M'rirt, Morocco, and had lived in Ripoll, Spain since he was four years old. He was the driver of the van that killed 13 people on La Rambla. He initially fled the scene of the attack on La Rambla through the Mercat de la Boqueria, then hijacked a car near the Zona Universitària station, stabbing the driver, Pau Pérez, to death. On 21 August, police caught up with him in Subirats, a village near Barcelona.  He was wearing a fake suicide vest and shouted "Allahu Akbar" before police shot and killed him.

According to police sources, his identity documents were found in the second van, which was intercepted by Catalan police in Vic. His mother told the press that her son had been brainwashed by the imam Abdelbaki Es Satty.

Houssaine Abouyaaqoub 
Houssaine Abouyaaqoub, aged 19, was the brother of Younes Abouyaaqoub and one of the attackers killed in Cambrils in the early hours of 18 August. He was a deliveryman for a kebab restaurant in Ripoll. Both Abouyaaqoub brothers were first cousins of Mohamed and Omar Hychami.

Moussa Oukabir 
Moussa Oukabir was 17 at the time of the attack. He was shot and killed by police after the Cambrils attack.

The Fiat Talento van used in the La Rambla attack had been rented using the ID of Oukabir's brother who told police that Moussa Oukabir had stolen his ID.

Moussa Oukabir had been living legally in Spain since 2005. In 2014 and 2015, he played futsal (a form of indoor football) for the local Ripoll youth team. In 2015, when asked on the social media website Kiwi what he would do in his first day as king of the world, he responded, "Kill the infidels and only spare Muslims who follow the religion." Moussa's brother has told the judge that Moussa had increased his prayer frequency, chided him for not spending time with Muslims only, and had told him that Muslims have to do "jihad, which implies war".

Said Aallaa 
Said Aallaa, 19, was born in Naour, Morocco. He had been living in Ribes de Freser, Spain, a village near Ripoll.

He was shot and killed by police after the Cambrils attack. La Vanguardia reported that Aallaa's social media contained photographs of firearms and that his religiosity was evidenced by his membership in Islamic study groups. Said had left a note in his room apologising for the harm he was about to cause.

Youssef Aallaa 
Aalla's death in the explosion at Alcanar was later confirmed by police from DNA at the explosion site. Like all the other suspects, Youssef was born in Morocco. Youssef was a brother of Said Aallaa.  Their father said Youssef attended the mosque.

Mohamed Hychami 
Mohamed Hychami, aged 24 was born in Mrirt, Morocco. He was the cousin of Younes Abouyaaqoub, the driver of the van in the La Rambla attack. He was in the Audi used in the Cambrils attack and was shot and killed by police there. Hychami's mother told the media that Mohamed had said he was leaving on vacation and would return in a week.

Omar Hychami 
Omar Hychami was 21, and was born in Mrirt, Morocco. He was the brother of fellow attacker Mohamed Hychami, and the cousin of the Rambla van driver Younes Abouyaaqoub. He worked for an agricultural construction sector.

Abdelbaki Es Satty 

Abdelbaki Es Satty was a 44-year-old imam in Ripoll who was born in Morocco in 1973 and arrived in Spain in 2002. He was convicted of drug smuggling in 2014 and was to be deported from Spain, but Es Satty claimed deportation violated his human rights and he remained in Spain. A successful asylum application in November 2014 facilitated him moving freely in the 26 EU countries of the Schengen area. On 21 August, he was confirmed to have died in the accidental explosion in Alcanar on 16 August. As the imam thought to have been important in radicalising the other terrorists, he has been considered the "mastermind" of the planned attacks.

Es Satty had been renting a room in the house for four months. Es Satty, who had been employed as imam at the Ripoll mosque since 2015, quit "abruptly" in June. He had also stayed in Belgium for approximately three months in 2016, where he had been searching for work, including in Vilvoorde. Investigators believe the imam might be aligned with the Salafist movement, but this might not be unusual, as one in three Islamic prayer centers in Catalonia is.

He has been described as "unfailingly courteous and studiously discreet", betraying no radicalism in his appearance and interactions with those who did not know him, and training those in his terrorist cell to also lead double lives.

Arrests 
Police arrested four men in connection with the attacks. Three of the men were arrested in Ripoll: the owner of the car used in the Cambrils attack, the brother of Moussa Oukabir, and a third man. In Alcanar, 20-year-old Mohamed Houli Chemlal, who survived the Alcanar explosion, was also arrested. Mohamed Houli Chemlal and Driss Oukabir have been charged with membership of a terror organisation and murder, with Mohamed also being charged with possession of explosives. Both were found to be guilty by the Audiencia Nacional in 2021, although being acquitted of terrorist homicide charges. By 24 August 2017, two of the suspects, Salh El Karib and Mohamed Aalla, had been released on certain conditions, including that they hand over their passports.

ISIL inspiration 
The ISIL-linked Amaq News Agency claimed the attack was carried out in response to the call for targeting states in the anti-ISIL coalition, of which Spain is a member, contributing about 400 soldiers training Iraqi Armed Forces and Iraqi Police forces.

The Economist portrayed the motivation for this 2017 attack in Spain as rather 'less obvious', Spain being 'a minor player in the campaign against ISIS and other groups', though admittedly Spain contributed 150 soldiers to Operation Serval fighting Islamic militants in Mali, and in online propaganda linked to ISIL the Sagrada Família basilica was suggested as a possible target and ISIL was suggested to have boasted about recovering the Islamic lands of Al-Andalus.

Reactions

Domestic 

Mossos d'Esquadra, the police force of Catalonia, launched Operation Cage to locate the perpetrators. All public events in Barcelona were cancelled, and both Carles Puigdemont, the President of the Generalitat of Catalonia, and Ada Colau, the Mayor of Barcelona, cancelled their holidays to return to the city and take part in crisis management. Likewise, Prime Minister of Spain Mariano Rajoy cancelled his holidays and travelled to Barcelona with the Spanish Deputy Prime Minister, Soraya Sáenz de Santamaría, and Juan Ignacio Zoido, the Spanish Minister of the Interior. Spain declared three days of mourning.

The day after the attacks, a minute's silence led by Catalan President Carles Puigdemont, Barcelona Mayor Ada Colau, and King Felipe VI of Spain was observed at Plaça de Catalunya, which ended with applause and chants of "No tinc por" ("I am not afraid"). During the following days candles and flowers were left at the Joan Miró mosaic at La Rambla, in memory of the victims. The King and Queen also left a wreath in the name of the Crown.

On 26 August 2017, a large crowd marched down the Passeig de Gràcia in Barcelona in a protest against the terror attacks. The march was called by the city council and Catalan government. Some people booed the King of Spain and displayed signs blaming the Head of State for the Spanish arms sales. Other demonstrators displayed Spanish and Catalan flags.

On 10 September 2017, the security and emergency services were awarded the Medal of Honour of the Catalan Parliament (Medalla d'Honor del Parlament de Catalunya). With this medal the Catalan Parliament recognises the dedication, effort, and courage of the Mossos d'Esquadra, Guàrdia Urbana de Barcelona, Local Police of Cambrils, and the Emergency Services. The Major of the Catalan Police, Josep Lluís Trapero Álvarez, collected the award and made a speech mourning the victims.

International 

Many world leaders reacted to the events, condemning the attacks and expressing shock and solidarity with Spain, as well as offering support.

News sources asked whether the attack would affect the vote in the 2017 Catalan independence referendum.

Aftermath
Several days after the attack, islamophobic incidents occurred in Sevilla, Logroño and Granada.

The Interior Ministry and the Cuerpo Nacional de Policía recommended the installation of bollards, but the Generalitat chose to increase the presence of police officers instead.

Threat to Spain and Gibraltar
On the night of 23 August 2017, the Islamic State of Iraq and the Levant uploaded a video praising the perpetrators of the attack and warning of more violence if the military actions against them in Syria and Iraq did not end, and threatening Gibraltar with an atomic bomb. The language used was Spanish. They also threatened to recreate al-Andalus as a caliphate and take revenge for the Muslims who died at the hands of the Spanish Inquisition.

The first author of the video was identified as Abu Lais Al Qurtubí (el Cordobés in Spanish) or Abu Laiz al Qurtubi, named Muhammad Yasin Ahram Pérez, Tomasa Pérez's oldest son, who converted to Islam after her marriage to the Moroccan Abdelah Ahram. He said "If you can’t make the hegira (journey) to the Islamic State, carry out jihad where you are; jihad doesn’t have borders. Allah willing, Al Andalus will become again what it was, part of the caliphate. Spanish Christians, don’t forget the Muslim blood spilt during the Spanish inquisition. We will take revenge for your massacre, the one you are carrying out now against Islamic State". The hooded author has been identified as Abu Salman Al-Andalus or Abu Salman al-Andalusí (el andaluz). Pérez stated: "We hope that Allah accepts the sacrifice of our brothers in Barcelona. Our war with you will continue until the world ends."

The threatening video to Gibraltar was published by Abu Albara Bin Malik and spread by Al Wafa. The threatening video was produced in Wilayat Jair, Deir Ezzor, Syria. According to Sahrawi journalist Bachir Mohamed Lahsen, terrorists only publish threats for propagandistic use and they should not be taken seriously.

As a response, Twitter users created an Internet meme based on the message by Pérez.

Verdict
In May 2021, the National Audience court sentenced three members of the jihadist organization which committed the attacks in 2017. Two of the accused, Mohamed Houli Chemlal and Driss Oukabir, were sentenced to an upwards of 53 and 46 years in prison respectively, the third, Said Ben Iazza, to 8 years in prison for the crime of collaboration. They were also banned from approaching the town of Alcanar, where they prepared the attacks.

2022 statements by José Manuel Villarejo 
In January 2022, former police commissioner José Manuel Villarejo, appeared to suggest that the Spanish authorities knew of Younes Abouyaaquob's plans ahead of time and used it to hamstring the Catalonian Independence movement, prompting Catalan president Pere Aragonès to call for an investigation. Many have dismissed the allegations as a conspiracy theory.

In popular media
In 2020, Catalan journalist Anna Teixidor published a book about the attacks titled Sense por de morir: Els silencis del 17-A. The book was published in Spanish and Catalan. 

A three-part docuseries 800 Meters about the attacks and the police investigation was released on Netflix on 25 March 2022. The series was directed by Elías León.

See also 
 2017 in Spain
 List of terrorist incidents in August 2017
 Timeline of Barcelona
 1987 Hipercor bombing
 2008 Barcelona terror plot

References

External links 

 

2010s in Barcelona
2017 in Catalonia
2017 murders in Spain
2017 road incidents in Europe
August 2017 crimes in Europe
August 2017 events in Spain
Baix Camp
Crime in Barcelona
Events in Barcelona
Explosions in 2017
Explosions in Spain
Islamic terrorism in Spain
Islamic terrorist incidents in 2017
La Rambla, Barcelona
Mass murder in 2017
Mass murder in Spain
Road incidents in Spain
Stabbing attacks in Spain
Terrorist incidents in Spain in 2017
Terrorist incidents in Spain
Terrorist incidents involving vehicular attacks
Vehicular rampage in Europe